Vincent Masingue, born 31 January 1976 in Saint-Martin-d'Hères, Isère, is a French former professional basketball player, who plays at  N°5 (2.05 m).

Biography

Career

Clubs
1993-1996 :  Levallois Sporting Club Basket (Pro A)
1996-1997 :  AS Bondy (NM1)
1997-1999 :  Levallois Sporting Club Basket (Pro B)
1999-2001 :  Élan Béarnais Pau-Orthez (Pro A)
2001-2001 :  Montpellier Paillade Basket (Pro A)
2001-2004 :  SLUC Nancy (Pro A)
2005-2007 :  ASVEL Villeurbanne (Pro A)
2007-2008 :  Hyères Toulon Var Basket (Pro A)

Titles

Club
Winner of the Korac Cup in 2002 with Nancy
Winner of Semaine des As in 2005 with Nancy
Champion de France Pro B in 1998 with Levallois

With France
30 selections (165 points) as of 22-02-07

Sources 

 Maxi Basket

External links
 Statistics at lnb.fr
 France team statistics at basketfrance.com

1976 births
Living people
ASVEL Basket players
Centers (basketball)
Élan Béarnais players
French men's basketball players
HTV Basket players
Levallois Sporting Club Basket players
Metropolitans 92 players
Montpellier Paillade Basket players
People from Saint-Martin-d'Hères
SLUC Nancy Basket players
Sportspeople from Isère